The Cousins Thackeray: Uddhav, Raj and the Shadow of their Senas is a political non-fiction book written by journalist Dhaval Kulkarni and published by Penguin Random House. The book is about the cousins Thackeray: - Shiv Sena leader Uddhav Thackeray and MNS leader Raj Thackeray.

About
Book is written by journalist and reporter Dhava Kulkarni and has been published by Penguin Random House in 2019. It has 299 pages and has span of 10 chapters.

Background 
Politics of Maharashtra, state in western India, had influence of Bal Thackeray who founded the Shiv sena, political party, which later went on to rule the state. The book starts with history of Thackeray family and prominently Prabodhankar Thackeray, father of Bal Thackeray; and socio-political activism of the former in Mumbai and Maharashtra.

In the later chapters book mentions factors which led to foundation of Shiv sena, its politics and alliance with BJP. Subsequently, book explores the life of The Thackeray Cousins—Uddhav and Raj—their politics and working style. Later, book has details about formation of Maharashtra Navnirman Sena and contemporary history.

Book, according to author, examines "identity politics, and the social, cultural and economic matrix that catalysed the formation of the Shiv Sena and the MNS from it".

Reviews 
Meena Menon reviewed the book for Firstpost and wrote that "fills the breach with interviews from a spectrum of journalists, politicians, and intellectuals to present a contemporary analysis of the two heirs to Bal Thackeray." She observed that book draws "emotional politics" out of Shivsena and author focuses on "micropolitics".

Gaurav Kanthwal, in a review for The Tribune, wrote that "book is not just about two supremos and their millitias, it also maps Maharashtra, particularly Mumbai, through the matrix of culture, economy, politics, and geography." Sushila Ravindranath noted that author summarises personalities of cousins Thackerays in this book while writing for The Asian Age.

References 

Non-fiction books
Penguin Books books